Events from the year 1797 in art.

Events
 Musée des Beaux-Arts d'Orléans established in France.

Works
 Caspar David Friedrich – Landscape with Temple in Ruins
 François Gérard – Belisarius
 Francisco Goya – Bernardo de Iriarte
 Anton Graff – Elisa von der Recke
 Henry Howard – Anne Flaxman (approximate date)
 Henry Tresham – The Earl of Warwick's Vow Previous to The Battle of Towton

Births
 January 19 – Cornelia Aletta van Hulst, Dutch painter (died 1870)
 April 5 – Johann Fischbach, Austrian painter of landscapes and genre art (died 1871)
 May 29 – Louise-Adéone Drölling, French painter and draughtswoman (died 1836)
 June 13 – Louis Pierre Henriquel-Dupont, French engraver (died 1892)
 July 12 – Adele Schopenhauer, German papercut artist and novelist (died 1849)
 June 16 – Sophie Fremiet, French painter (died 1867)
 July 17 – Hippolyte Delaroche, French painter (died 1856)
 August 8 – Joseph-Nicolas Robert-Fleury, French painter (died 1890)
 August 20 – Johan Frederik Møller, Danish painter and photographer (died 1871)
 September 5 – John Blennerhassett Martin, American painter, engraver and lithographer (died 1857)
 September 13 – Joseph Stannard, English painter of the Norwich school (died 1830)
 September 19 – Jan Suchodolski, Polish painter and Army officer (died 1875)
 September 25 – Cornelis Kruseman, Dutch painter (died 1857)
 October 9 – Henry Collen, English Royal miniature portrait painter (died 1879)
 October 29 – Friedrich Loos, Austrian Biedermeier style painter, etcher and lithographer (died 1890)
 date unknown
 Tivadar Alconiere, Hungarian painter (died 1865)
 Tommaso Benedetti, English-born Austrian painter (died 1863)
 Louis-Henri Brévière, French wood-engraver (died 1869)
 Joseph-Désiré Court, French painter of historical subjects and portraits (died 1865)
 Hiroshige, Japanese ukiyo-e artist (died 1858)
 Charles C. Ingham, Irish portrait painter and later founder of the New York National Academy of Design (died 1863)
 Louis Stanislas Marin-Lavigne, French painter and lithographer (died 1860)
 Nicolae Teodorescu, Moldavian, later Romanian church painter (muralist) (died 1880)
 probable
 John O'Keeffe, Irish portrait and figure painter (died 1838)
 Utagawa Kuniyoshi, Japanese artist of the ukiyo-e style of woodblock prints and painting and belonged to the Utagawa school (died 1861)

Deaths
 February 12 – Pierre-François Basan, French engraver (born 1723)
 March 6 – William Hodges, English landscape painter (born 1744)
 March 30 – Giorgio Anselmi, Italian painter (born 1723)
 April 4– Pierre-François Berruer, French sculptor (born 1733)
 June 23 – Antonio Diziani, Italian painter of veduta, landscapes and vistas (born 1737)
 July 18 – Jean-Bernard Restout, French painter (born 1732)
 August 18 – Josiah Spode, English potter (born 1733)
 August 29 – Joseph Wright of Derby, English painter (born 1734)
 September 29 - George Raper, English nature artist (born 1769)
 December 14 – John Robert Cozens, English draftsman and painter of romantic watercolor landscapes (born 1752)
 date unknown
 Manuel Francisco Álvarez de la Peña, Spanish sculptor (born 1727)
 Christina Elisabeth Carowsky, Swedish portrait painter (born 1745)
 Charles Joseph Flipart, French painter and engraver (born 1721)
 Emanuel Granberg, Finnish painter (born 1754)
 Thomas Kirk, English painter, illustrator and engraver (born 1765)

 
Years of the 18th century in art
1790s in art